Common Gender is a 2012 Bangladeshi film starring Dolly Zahur and Chitralekha Guha. It is the first Bangladeshi film to portray the lives of Hijra or transgender people. It is one of the first films in world cinema to have two transgender people as lead characters. It was subsequently released in the United States. Chitralekha Guho plays a pivotal character.

Story
Sushmita (born Sushmoy), a hijra, who resides in a group of transgender people, and makes a living by dance performances at various wedding ceremonies. One day at a wedding night, she meets a boy – Sanjay, who is straight – who Sushmita falls in love with. Despite Sushmita being transgender, Sanjay accepts their love.

Cast
 Dileep Chakraborty as Sanjay
 Saju Khadem as Sushmita

Soundtrack

References 

2012 films
2012 LGBT-related films
Films scored by Arfin Rumey
Bengali-language Bangladeshi films
Transgender-related films
2010s Bengali-language films